Zoltán Greguss (May 10, 1904 – December 20, 1987) was a Hungarian film actor.

Selected filmography

 Az én lányom nem olyan (1937) - Fekete Ferenc
 300.000 pengö az utcán (1937) - Máté Egon
 A falu rossza (1938) - Göndör Sándor
 Az örök titok (1938) - Kapitány
 Black Diamonds (1938) - Szaffrán Péter - Evila võlegénye
 Uz Bence (1938) - Jonescu
 Gyimesi vadvirág (1939) - Fábián Gyula
 Zwischen Strom und Steppe (1939) - Zigeuner
 Tiszavirág (1939) - Laci - cigánylegény
 Öt óra 40 (1939) - Louis Melotti
 Zúgnak a szirénák (1939)
 Erdélyi kastély (1940) - Eszéky György báró
 Pénz beszél (1940)
 Mária két éjszakája (1940) - Chatell Iván
 Ismeretlen ellenfél (1940) - A 127-es kém
 Elnémult harangok (1940) - Radescu
 Szeressük egymást (1941) - Szitár Péter / Galáti Péter
 The Relative of His Excellency (1941) - Tihamér - Alíz bátya
 Európa nem válaszol (1941) - Olivera
 Sárga rózsa (1941) - Lacza Ferkó
 Bob herceg (1941) - Félix - gárdakapitány
 Miért? (1941) - Szmokingos úr
 Bünös vagyok! (1942) - Frici, Lola barátja
 Jelmezbál (1942) - Széky, festõmûvész
 Halálos csók (1942) - Cesare,a festõ
 Szíriusz (1942) - Osztrák
 A hegyek lánya (1942) - Davarin, kocsislegény
 Az éjszaka lánya (1943) - Jani - Bözsi szerelme
 Ópiumkeringö (1943) - Petrovics Tibor,bankár
 Éjféli gyors (1943) - Finta János,fútõ
 Iva samodiva (1943) - Milionerat
 Lejtön (1944) - Armand Dernisse, pártvezér
 Sárga kaszinó (1944) - Várhegyi,a Gramofonlemez Vállalat igazgatója
 A gazdátlan asszony (1944) - Kotovszky Iván
 Felszabadult föld (1951) - Kretz, földbirtokos
 Gyarmat a föld alatt (1951) - Forray
 Gábor diák (1956) - Ali pasa
 Professor Hannibal (1956) - Muray
 Mese a 12 találatról (1957) - Péntek Lajos,KIK vezetõ
 Édes Anna (1958) - Tatár Gábor
 A megfelelö ember (1960) - Alvarez Gonzales
 Légy jó mindhalálig (1960) - Doroghy úr
 Puskák és galambok (1961)
 Megöltek egy lányt (1961)
 Áprilisi riadó (1962)
 The Man of Gold (1962) - Brazovics
 Drama of the Lark (1964) - Környei Bálint
 A pénzcsináló (1964) - Fõkapitány
 Mit csinált Felséged 3-tól 5-ig? (1964) - Pápai követ
 A köszívü ember fiai (1965) - Magyar tiszt
 Sok hüség semmiért (1966) - Politikus
 Aranysárkány (1966) - Dr. Ebeczky - ügyvéd
 Sellö a pecsétgyürün I (1967) - Vöröskõy
 Sellö a pecsétgyürün II (1967) - Vöröskõy
 Three Nights of Love (1967) - Melitta férje
 Emma Hamilton (1968) - (uncredited)
 Utazás a koponyám körül (1970) - Sorbanálló
 Gyula vitéz télen-nyáron (1970) - Fõorvos
 Volt egyszer egy család (1972) - Khünrfeld gyáros
 Nápolyt látni és... (1973) - Kollár Rezsõ, igazgató
 Kojak Budapesten (1980) - Szalánczy

Bibliography
 Cunningham, John. Hungarian Cinema: From Coffee House to Multiplex. Wallflower Press, 2004.

External links

1904 births
1986 deaths
Hungarian male film actors
Male actors from Budapest
20th-century Hungarian male actors